Toraja Airport , formerly Buntu Kunik Airport, is an airport at Mengkendek, Tana Toraja Regency, South Sulawesi, Indonesia. It was built to replace the Pongtiku Airport, which was closed due to lack of land for expansion to cope with increasing passenger demands. The airport started soft operations on 4 September 2020, and was officially inaugurated by President Joko Widodo on 18 March 2021.

Toraja Airport has a passenger terminal with an area of 1,152 square meters, and can serve 45 thousand passengers annually.

Airlines and destinations

References

Airports in South Sulawesi